Dimethyl-4-phenylenediamine is an amine. It has been used as an accelerator for the vulcanization of rubber. It can be used in oxidase tests.

Synthesis
Dimethyl-4-phenylenediamine is made by the nitrosylation of dimethylaniline followed by reduction.

Applications
Dimethyl-4-phenylenediamine can be converted to methylene blue by reaction with dimethylaniline and sodium thiosulfate in several steps:

It is used as accelerator for the vulcanization of rubber, being first converted to the corresponding mercaptobenzothiazole.

References

Anilines
Diamines
Dimethylamino compounds